
Gmina Drużbice is a rural gmina (administrative district) in Bełchatów County, Łódź Voivodeship, in central Poland.

Villages
Gmina Drużbice contains the villages and settlements of Brzezie, Bukowie Dolne, Bukowie Górne, Chynów, Depszczyk, Drużbice, Drużbice-Kolonia, Gadki, Głupice, Głupice-Parcela, Gręboszów, Helenów, Hucisko, Janówek, Józefów, Kącik, Katarzynka, Kazimierzów, Kobyłki, Łazy, Łęczyca, Marki, Nowa Wieś, Patok, Pieńki Głupickie, Podstoła, Rasy, Rawicz, Rawicz-Podlas, Rożniatowice, Skrajne, Stefanów, Stoki, Suchcice, Teofilów, Teresin, Wadlew, Wdowin, Wdowin-Kolonia, Wola Głupicka, Wola Rożniatowska, Wrzosy, Zabiełłów, Zalesie, Żbijowa, Zofiówka and Zwierzyniec Duży.

Neighbouring gminas
Gmina Drużbice is bordered by the gminas of Bełchatów, Dłutów, Grabica, Wola Krzysztoporska and Zelów.

References
Polish official population figures 2006

Druzbice
Bełchatów County